Henri Boucheron (born 20 May 1998) is a New Caledonian international footballer who plays as a forward for New Caledonia Super Ligue side AS Magenta.

Career statistics

International

References

1998 births
Living people
New Caledonian footballers
New Caledonia international footballers
Association football forwards
AS Magenta players